Damage Done is the sixth full-length studio album by the Swedish melodic death metal band Dark Tranquillity. Here, the band returns to a more classic style while holding the changes made in their albums Haven and Projector, especially in the keyboards, but this is the first record since The Mind's I that does not feature clean vocals. Martin Henriksson started doing some "lead guitar riffs" on the record, so the band showed influences from The Gallery in the duality of lead guitars. Mikael Stanne said that the lyrics on this album are about the frailty of life.

The song "Cathode Ray Sunshine" is featured in the video game's soundtrack, Brütal Legend.

Several versions of the album feature a bonus track entitled "I, Deception" as well as the "Monochromatic Stains" video clip but it is known that the limited edition digipak contains them. The Japanese version of the album features the bonus track, "The Poison Well". The vinyl release includes "I, Deception" and also has different cover art. The 2009 reissue includes bonus tracks and digitally remastered audio.

This is the first release for the band to chart. The album cover art which was done by Niklas Sundin feature's Mikael Stanne kneeling and holding his head.

Track listing

Credits

Personnel

Dark Tranquillity 
 Mikael Stanne - vocals
 Niklas Sundin - lead guitar
 Martin Henriksson - rhythm guitar
 Martin Brändström - electronics
 Michael Nicklasson - bass
 Anders Jivarp - drums

Production 
 Dark Tranquillity – production
 Fredrik Nordström - production, engineering
 Patrik J. Sten - engineering
 Göran Finnberg - audio mastering
 Ulf Horbelt – remastering
 Achilleas Gatsopoulos - Video for "Monochromatic Stains".
 Cabin Fever Media - Co-Art direction and design
 Tue Madsen – mixing, mastering ("The Treason Wall" only)

Studios 
 The Mastering Room – mastering
 DMS, Marl, Germany – remastering

Release history

Charts

References

External links 
 
 Damage Done at Century Media Records
 Damage Done (2009 Reissue) at Century Media Records

2002 albums
Albums produced by Fredrik Nordström
Albums recorded at Studio Fredman
Century Media Records albums
Dark Tranquillity albums